Aloe angelica (Wylliespoort Aloe) is a species of aloe endemic to the Soutpansberg and Blouberg mountains in the Northern Province of South Africa. It is a large, single-stemmed plant, 3–4 meters in height, with green, succulent leaves, bent backward, and red-budded flowers in compact bunches on much-branched racemes, turning yellow as they flower.

References
 Fl. Pl. South Africa 14: 554 1934.
 Trees and Shrubs of Mpumalanga and Kruger National Park, by Ernst Schmidt, Mervyn Lotter, Warren McCleland, Jacana Media, 2002, page 58. .
 The Plant List
 JSTOR
 Encyclopedia of Life

angelica